A statistical hypothesis test is a method of statistical inference used to decide whether the data at hand sufficiently support a particular hypothesis.
Hypothesis testing allows us to make probabilistic statements about population parameters.

History

Early use
While hypothesis testing was popularized early in the 20th century, early forms were used in the 1700s. The first use is credited to John Arbuthnot (1710), followed by Pierre-Simon Laplace (1770s), in analyzing the human sex ratio at birth; see .

Modern origins and early controversy
Modern significance testing is largely the product of Karl Pearson (p-value, Pearson's chi-squared test), William Sealy Gosset (Student's t-distribution), and Ronald Fisher ("null hypothesis", analysis of variance, "significance test"), while hypothesis testing was developed by Jerzy Neyman and Egon Pearson (son of Karl). Ronald Fisher began his life in statistics as a Bayesian (Zabell 1992), but Fisher soon grew disenchanted with the subjectivity involved (namely use of the principle of indifference when determining prior probabilities), and sought to provide a more "objective" approach to inductive inference.

Fisher emphasized rigorous experimental design and methods to extract a result from few samples assuming Gaussian distributions. Neyman (who teamed with the younger Pearson) emphasized mathematical rigor and methods to obtain more results from many samples and a wider range of distributions. Modern hypothesis testing is an inconsistent hybrid of the Fisher vs Neyman/Pearson formulation, methods and terminology developed in the early 20th century.

Fisher popularized the "significance test". He required a null-hypothesis (corresponding to a population frequency distribution) and a sample. His (now familiar) calculations determined whether to reject the null-hypothesis or not. Significance testing did not utilize an alternative hypothesis so there was no concept of a Type II error.

The p-value was devised as an informal, but objective, index meant to help a researcher determine (based on other knowledge) whether to modify future experiments or strengthen one's faith in the null hypothesis. Hypothesis testing (and Type I/II errors) was devised by Neyman and Pearson as a more objective alternative to Fisher's p-value, also meant to determine researcher behaviour, but without requiring any inductive inference by the researcher.

Neyman & Pearson considered a different problem to Fisher (which they called "hypothesis testing"). They initially considered two simple hypotheses (both with frequency distributions). They calculated two probabilities and typically selected the hypothesis associated with the higher probability (the hypothesis more likely to have generated the sample). Their method always selected a hypothesis. It also allowed the calculation of both types of error probabilities.

Fisher and Neyman/Pearson clashed bitterly. Neyman/Pearson considered their formulation to be an improved generalization of significance testing (the defining paper was abstract; Mathematicians have generalized and refined the theory for decades). Fisher thought that it was not applicable to scientific research because often, during the course of the experiment, it is discovered that the initial assumptions about the null hypothesis are questionable due to unexpected sources of error. He believed that the use of rigid reject/accept decisions based on models formulated before data is collected was incompatible with this common scenario faced by scientists and attempts to apply this method to scientific research would lead to mass confusion.

The dispute between Fisher and Neyman–Pearson was waged on philosophical grounds, characterized by a philosopher as a dispute over the proper role of models in statistical inference.

Events intervened: Neyman accepted a position in the University of California, Berkeley in 1938, breaking his partnership with Pearson and separating disputants (who had occupied the same building) by much of the planetary diameter. World War II provided an intermission in the debate. The dispute between Fisher and Neyman terminated (unresolved after 27 years) with Fisher's death in 1962. Neyman wrote a well-regarded eulogy. Some of Neyman's later publications reported p-values and significance levels.

The modern version of hypothesis testing is a hybrid of the two approaches that resulted from confusion by writers of statistical textbooks (as predicted by Fisher) beginning in the 1940s (but signal detection, for example, still uses the Neyman/Pearson formulation). Great conceptual differences and many caveats in addition to those mentioned above were ignored. Neyman and Pearson provided the stronger terminology, the more rigorous mathematics and the more consistent philosophy, but the subject taught today in introductory statistics has more similarities with Fisher's method than theirs.

Sometime around 1940, authors of statistical text books began combining the two approaches by using the p-value in place of the test statistic (or data) to test against the Neyman–Pearson "significance level".

Early choices of null hypothesis
Paul Meehl has argued that the epistemological importance of the choice of null hypothesis has gone largely unacknowledged. When the null hypothesis is predicted by theory, a more precise experiment will be a more severe test of the underlying theory. When the null hypothesis defaults to "no difference" or "no effect", a more precise experiment is a less severe test of the theory that motivated performing the experiment. An examination of the origins of the latter practice may therefore be useful:

1778: Pierre Laplace compares the birthrates of boys and girls in multiple European cities. He states: "it is natural to conclude that these possibilities are very nearly in the same ratio". Thus Laplace's null hypothesis that the birthrates of boys and girls should be equal given "conventional wisdom".

1900: Karl Pearson develops the chi squared test to determine "whether a given form of frequency curve will effectively describe the samples drawn from a given population." Thus the null hypothesis is that a population is described by some distribution predicted by theory. He uses as an example the numbers of five and sixes in the Weldon dice throw data.

1904: Karl Pearson develops the concept of "contingency" in order to determine whether outcomes are independent of a given categorical factor. Here the null hypothesis is by default that two things are unrelated (e.g. scar formation and death rates from smallpox). The null hypothesis in this case is no longer predicted by theory or conventional wisdom, but is instead the principle of indifference that led Fisher and others to dismiss the use of "inverse probabilities".

Philosophy 
Hypothesis testing and philosophy intersect. Inferential statistics, which includes hypothesis testing, is applied probability. Both probability and its application are intertwined with philosophy. Philosopher David Hume wrote, "All knowledge degenerates into probability." Competing practical definitions of probability reflect philosophical differences. The most common application of hypothesis testing is in the scientific interpretation of experimental data, which is naturally studied by the philosophy of science.

Fisher and Neyman opposed the subjectivity of probability. Their views contributed to the objective definitions. The core of their historical disagreement was philosophical.

Many of the philosophical criticisms of hypothesis testing are discussed by statisticians in other contexts, particularly correlation does not imply causation and the design of experiments.
Hypothesis testing is of continuing interest to philosophers.

Education 

Statistics is increasingly being taught in schools with hypothesis testing being one of the elements taught. Many conclusions reported in the popular press (political opinion polls to medical studies) are based on statistics. Some writers have stated that statistical analysis of this kind allows for thinking clearly about problems involving mass data, as well as the effective reporting of trends and inferences from said data, but caution that writers for a broad public should have a solid understanding of the field in order to use the terms and concepts correctly. An introductory college statistics class places much emphasis on hypothesis testing – perhaps half of the course. Such fields as literature and divinity now include findings based on statistical analysis (see the Bible Analyzer). An introductory statistics class teaches hypothesis testing as a cookbook process. Hypothesis testing is also taught at the postgraduate level. Statisticians learn how to create good statistical test procedures (like z, Student's t, F and chi-squared). Statistical hypothesis testing is considered a mature area within statistics, but a limited amount of development continues.

An academic study states that the cookbook method of teaching introductory statistics leaves no time for history, philosophy or controversy. Hypothesis testing has been taught as received unified method. Surveys showed that graduates of the class were filled with philosophical misconceptions (on all aspects of statistical inference) that persisted among instructors. While the problem was addressed more than a decade ago, and calls for educational reform continue, students still graduate from statistics classes holding fundamental misconceptions about hypothesis testing. Ideas for improving the teaching of hypothesis testing include encouraging students to search for statistical errors in published papers, teaching the history of statistics and emphasizing the controversy in a generally dry subject.

The testing process 
In the statistics literature, statistical hypothesis testing plays a fundamental role. There are two mathematically equivalent processes that can be used.

The usual line of reasoning is as follows:
 There is an initial research hypothesis of which the truth is unknown.
 The first step is to state the relevant null and alternative hypotheses. This is important, as mis-stating the hypotheses will muddy the rest of the process. 
 The second step is to consider the statistical assumptions being made about the sample in doing the test; for example, assumptions about the statistical independence or about the form of the distributions of the observations. This is equally important as invalid assumptions will mean that the results of the test are invalid.
 Decide which test is appropriate, and state the relevant test statistic T.
 Derive the distribution of the test statistic under the null hypothesis from the assumptions. In standard cases this will be a well-known result. For example, the test statistic might follow a Student's t distribution with known degrees of freedom, or a normal distribution with known mean and variance. If the distribution of the test statistic is completely fixed by the null hypothesis we call the hypothesis simple, otherwise it is called composite.
 Select a significance level (α), a probability threshold below which the null hypothesis will be rejected. Common values are 5% and 1%.
 The distribution of the test statistic under the null hypothesis partitions the possible values of T into those for which the null hypothesis is rejected—the so-called critical region—and those for which it is not. The probability of the critical region is α. In the case of a composite null hypothesis, the maximal probability of the critical region is α.
 Compute from the observations the observed value tobs of the test statistic T.
 Decide to either reject the null hypothesis in favor of the alternative or not reject it. The decision rule is to reject the null hypothesis H0 if the observed value tobs is in the critical region, and not to reject the null hypothesis otherwise.

A common alternative formulation of this process goes as follows:
 Compute from the observations the observed value tobs of the test statistic T.
 Calculate the p-value. This is the probability, under the null hypothesis, of sampling a test statistic at least as extreme as that which was observed (the maximal probability of that event, if the hypothesis is composite).
 Reject the null hypothesis, in favor of the alternative hypothesis, if and only if the p-value is less than (or equal to) the significance level (the selected probability) threshold (α), for example 0.05 or 0.01.

The former process was advantageous in the past when only tables of test statistics at common probability thresholds were available. It allowed a decision to be made without the calculation of a probability. It was adequate for classwork and for operational use, but it was deficient for reporting results. The latter process relied on extensive tables or on computational support not always available. The explicit calculation of a probability is useful for reporting. The calculations are now trivially performed with appropriate software.

The difference in the two processes applied to the Radioactive suitcase example (below):
 "The Geiger-counter reading is 10. The limit is 9. Check the suitcase."
 "The Geiger-counter reading is high; 97% of safe suitcases have lower readings. The limit is 95%. Check the suitcase."
The former report is adequate, the latter gives a more detailed explanation of the data and the reason why the suitcase is being checked.

Not rejecting the null hypothesis does not mean the null hypothesis is "accepted" (see the Interpretation section).

The processes described here are perfectly adequate for computation. They seriously neglect the design of experiments considerations.

It is particularly critical that appropriate sample sizes be estimated before conducting the experiment.

The phrase "test of significance" was coined by statistician Ronald Fisher.

Interpretation
The p-value is the probability that a given result (or a more significant result) would occur under the null hypothesis. At a significance level of 0.05, a fair coin would be expected to (incorrectly) reject the null hypothesis (that it is fair) in about 1 out of every 20 tests. The p-value does not provide the probability that either the null hypothesis or its opposite is correct (a common source of confusion).

If the p-value is less than the chosen significance threshold (equivalently, if the observed test statistic is in the critical region), then we say the null hypothesis is rejected at the chosen level of significance. If the p-value is not less than the chosen significance threshold (equivalently, if the observed test statistic is outside the critical region), then the null hypothesis is not rejected.

In the Lady tasting tea example (below), Fisher required the Lady to properly categorize all of the cups of tea to justify the conclusion that the result was unlikely to result from chance. His test revealed that if the lady was effectively guessing at random (the null hypothesis), there was a 1.4% chance that the observed results (perfectly ordered tea) would occur.

Rejecting the hypothesis that a large paw print originated from a bear does not immediately prove the existence of Bigfoot. Hypothesis testing emphasizes the rejection, which is based on a probability, rather than the acceptance.

"The probability of rejecting the null hypothesis is a function of five factors: whether the test is one- or two-tailed, the level of significance, the standard deviation, the amount of deviation from the null hypothesis, and the number of observations."

Use and importance
Statistics are helpful in analyzing most collections of data. This is equally true of hypothesis testing which can justify conclusions even when no scientific theory exists. In the Lady tasting tea example, it was "obvious" that no difference existed between (milk poured into tea) and (tea poured into milk). The data contradicted the "obvious".

Real world applications of hypothesis testing include:
 Testing whether more men than women suffer from nightmares
 Establishing authorship of documents
 Evaluating the effect of the full moon on behavior
 Determining the range at which a bat can detect an insect by echo
 Deciding whether hospital carpeting results in more infections
 Selecting the best means to stop smoking
 Checking whether bumper stickers reflect car owner behavior
 Testing the claims of handwriting analysts

Statistical hypothesis testing plays an important role in the whole of statistics and in statistical inference. For example, Lehmann (1992) in a review of the fundamental paper by Neyman and Pearson (1933) says: "Nevertheless, despite their shortcomings, the new paradigm formulated in the 1933 paper, and the many developments carried out within its framework continue to play a central role in both the theory and practice of statistics and can be expected to do so in the foreseeable future".

Significance testing has been the favored statistical tool in some experimental social sciences (over 90% of articles in the Journal of Applied Psychology during the early 1990s). Other fields have favored the estimation of parameters (e.g. effect size). Significance testing is used as a substitute for the traditional comparison of predicted value and experimental result at the core of the scientific method. When theory is only capable of predicting the sign of a relationship, a directional (one-sided) hypothesis test can be configured so that only a statistically significant result supports theory. This form of theory appraisal is the most heavily criticized application of hypothesis testing.

Cautions
"If the government required statistical procedures to carry warning labels like those on drugs, most inference methods would have long labels indeed." This caution applies to hypothesis tests and alternatives to them.

The successful hypothesis test is associated with a probability and a type-I error rate. The conclusion might be wrong.

The conclusion of the test is only as solid as the sample upon which it is based. The design of the experiment is critical. A number of unexpected effects have been observed including:
 The clever Hans effect. A horse appeared to be capable of doing simple arithmetic.
 The Hawthorne effect. Industrial workers were more productive in better illumination, and most productive in worse.
 The placebo effect. Pills with no medically active ingredients were remarkably effective.
A statistical analysis of misleading data produces misleading conclusions. The issue of data quality can be more subtle. In forecasting for example, there is no agreement on a measure of forecast accuracy. In the absence of a consensus measurement, no decision based on measurements will be without controversy.

Publication bias: Statistically nonsignificant results may be less likely to be published, which can bias the literature.

Multiple testing: When multiple true null hypothesis tests are conducted at once without adjustment, the overall probability of Type I error is higher than the nominal alpha level.

Those making critical decisions based on the results of a hypothesis test are prudent to look at the details rather than the conclusion alone. In the physical sciences most results are fully accepted only when independently confirmed. The general advice concerning statistics is, "Figures never lie, but liars figure" (anonymous).

Definition of terms
The following definitions are mainly based on the exposition in the book by Lehmann and Romano:

Statistical hypothesis: A statement about the parameters describing a population (not a sample).
Test statistic: A value calculated from a sample without any unknown parameters, often to summarize the sample for comparison purposes.
: Any hypothesis which specifies the population distribution completely.
Composite hypothesis: Any hypothesis which does not specify the population distribution completely.
Null hypothesis (H0) 
Positive data: Data that enable the investigator to reject a null hypothesis.
Alternative hypothesis (H1) 
Region of rejection / Critical region: The set of values of the test statistic for which the null hypothesis is rejected.
Critical value
Power of a test (1 − β)
 Size: For simple hypotheses, this is the test's probability of incorrectly rejecting the null hypothesis. The false positive rate. For composite hypotheses this is the supremum of the probability of rejecting the null hypothesis over all cases covered by the null hypothesis. The complement of the false positive rate is termed specificity in biostatistics. ("This is a specific test. Because the result is positive, we can confidently say that the patient has the condition.") See sensitivity and specificity and Type I and type II errors for exhaustive definitions.
Significance level of a test (α)
p-value 
Statistical significance test: A predecessor to the statistical hypothesis test (see the Origins section). An experimental result was said to be statistically significant if a sample was sufficiently inconsistent with the (null) hypothesis. This was variously considered common sense, a pragmatic heuristic for identifying meaningful experimental results, a convention establishing a threshold of statistical evidence or a method for drawing conclusions from data. The statistical hypothesis test added mathematical rigor and philosophical consistency to the concept by making the alternative hypothesis explicit. The term is loosely used for the modern version which is now part of statistical hypothesis testing.
Conservative test: A test is conservative if, when constructed for a given nominal significance level, the true probability of incorrectly rejecting the null hypothesis is never greater than the nominal level.
Exact test

A statistical hypothesis test compares a test statistic (z or t for examples) to a threshold. The test statistic (the formula found in the table below) is based on optimality. For a fixed level of Type I error rate, use of these statistics minimizes Type II error rates (equivalent to maximizing power). The following terms describe tests in terms of such optimality:

Most powerful test: For a given size or significance level, the test with the greatest power (probability of rejection) for a given value of the parameter(s) being tested, contained in the alternative hypothesis.
Uniformly most powerful test (UMP)

Common test statistics

Examples

Human sex ratio

The earliest use of statistical hypothesis testing is generally credited to the question of whether male and female births are equally likely (null hypothesis), which was addressed in the 1700s by John Arbuthnot (1710), and later by Pierre-Simon Laplace (1770s).

Arbuthnot examined birth records in London for each of the 82 years from 1629 to 1710, and applied the sign test, a simple non-parametric test. In every year, the number of males born in London exceeded the number of females. Considering more male or more female births as equally likely, the probability of the observed outcome is 0.582, or about 1 in 4,836,000,000,000,000,000,000,000; in modern terms, this is the p-value. Arbuthnot concluded that this is too small to be due to chance and must instead be due to divine providence: "From whence it follows, that it is Art, not Chance, that governs." In modern terms, he rejected the null hypothesis of equally likely male and female births at the p = 1/282 significance level.

Laplace considered the statistics of almost half a million births. The statistics showed an excess of boys compared to girls. He concluded by calculation of a p-value that the excess was a real, but unexplained, effect.

Lady tasting tea

In a famous example of hypothesis testing, known as the Lady tasting tea, Dr. Muriel Bristol, a colleague of Fisher, claimed to be able to tell whether the tea or the milk was added first to a cup. Fisher proposed to give her eight cups, four of each variety, in random order. One could then ask what the probability was for her getting the number she got correct, but just by chance. The null hypothesis was that the Lady had no such ability. The test statistic was a simple count of the number of successes in selecting the 4 cups. The critical region was the single case of 4 successes of 4 possible based on a conventional probability criterion (< 5%). A pattern of 4 successes corresponds to 1 out of 70 possible combinations (p≈ 1.4%). Fisher asserted that no alternative hypothesis was (ever) required. The lady correctly identified every cup, which would be considered a statistically significant result.

Courtroom trial
A statistical test procedure is comparable to a criminal trial; a defendant is considered not guilty as long as his or her guilt is not proven. The prosecutor tries to prove the guilt of the defendant. Only when there is enough evidence for the prosecution is the defendant convicted.

In the start of the procedure, there are two hypotheses : "the defendant is not guilty", and : "the defendant is guilty". The first one, is called the null hypothesis. The second one, is called the alternative hypothesis. It is the alternative hypothesis that one hopes to support.

The hypothesis of innocence is rejected only when an error is very unlikely, because one doesn't want to convict an innocent defendant. Such an error is called error of the first kind (i.e., the conviction of an innocent person), and the occurrence of this error is controlled to be rare. As a consequence of this asymmetric behaviour, an error of the second kind (acquitting a person who committed the crime), is more common.

A criminal trial can be regarded as either or both of two decision processes: guilty vs not guilty or evidence vs a threshold ("beyond a reasonable doubt"). In one view, the defendant is judged; in the other view the performance of the prosecution (which bears the burden of proof) is judged. A hypothesis test can be regarded as either a judgment of a hypothesis or as a judgment of evidence.

Philosopher's beans
The following example was produced by a philosopher describing scientific methods generations before hypothesis testing was
formalized and popularized.

Few beans of this handful are white.
Most beans in this bag are white.
Therefore: Probably, these beans were taken from another bag.
This is an hypothetical inference.

The beans in the bag are the population. The handful are the sample. The null hypothesis is that the sample originated from the population. The criterion for rejecting the null-hypothesis is the "obvious" difference in appearance (an informal difference in the mean). The interesting result is that consideration of a real population and a real sample produced an imaginary bag. The philosopher was considering logic rather than probability. To be a real statistical hypothesis test, this example requires the formalities of a probability calculation and a comparison of that probability to a standard.

A simple generalization of the example considers a mixed bag of beans and a handful that contain either very few or very many white beans. The generalization considers both extremes. It requires more calculations and more comparisons to arrive at a formal answer, but the core philosophy is unchanged; If the composition of the handful is greatly different from that of the bag, then the sample probably originated from another bag. The original example is termed a one-sided or a one-tailed test while the generalization is termed a two-sided or two-tailed test.

The statement also relies on the inference that the sampling was random.  If someone had been picking through the bag to find white beans, then it would explain why the handful had so many white beans, and also explain why the number of white beans in the bag was depleted (although the bag is probably intended to be assumed much larger than one's hand).

Clairvoyant card game
A person (the subject) is tested for clairvoyance. They are shown the back face of a randomly chosen playing card 25 times and asked which of the four suits it belongs to. The number of hits, or correct answers, is called X.

As we try to find evidence of their clairvoyance, for the time being the null hypothesis is that the person is not clairvoyant. The alternative is: the person is (more or less) clairvoyant.

If the null hypothesis is valid, the only thing the test person can do is guess. For every card, the probability (relative frequency) of any single suit appearing is 1/4. If the alternative is valid, the test subject will predict the suit correctly with probability greater than 1/4. We will call the probability of guessing correctly p. The hypotheses, then, are:
 null hypothesis      (just guessing)
and
 alternative hypothesis     (true clairvoyant).

When the test subject correctly predicts all 25 cards, we will consider them clairvoyant, and reject the null hypothesis. Thus also with 24 or 23 hits. With only 5 or 6 hits, on the other hand, there is no cause to consider them so. But what about 12 hits, or 17 hits? What is the critical number, c, of hits, at which point we consider the subject to be clairvoyant? How do we determine the critical value c? With the choice c=25 (i.e. we only accept clairvoyance when all cards are predicted correctly) we're more critical than with c=10. In the first case almost no test subjects will be recognized to be clairvoyant, in the second case, a certain number will pass the test. In practice, one decides how critical one will be. That is, one decides how often one accepts an error of the first kind – a false positive, or Type I error. With c = 25 the probability of such an error is:

and hence, very small. The probability of a false positive is the probability of randomly guessing correctly all 25 times.

Being less critical, with c=10, gives:

Thus, c = 10 yields a much greater probability of false positive.

Before the test is actually performed, the maximum acceptable probability of a Type I error (α) is determined. Typically, values in the range of 1% to 5% are selected. (If the maximum acceptable error rate is zero, an infinite number of correct guesses is required.) Depending on this Type 1 error rate, the critical value c is calculated. For example, if we select an error rate of 1%, c is calculated thus:

From all the numbers c, with this property, we choose the smallest, in order to minimize the probability of a Type II error, a false negative. For the above example, we select: .

Radioactive suitcase
As an example, consider determining whether a suitcase contains some radioactive material. Placed under a Geiger counter, it produces 10 counts per minute. The null hypothesis is that no radioactive material is in the suitcase and that all measured counts are due to ambient radioactivity typical of the surrounding air and harmless objects. We can then calculate how likely it is that we would observe 10 counts per minute if the null hypothesis were true. If the null hypothesis predicts (say) on average 9 counts per minute, then according to the Poisson distribution typical for radioactive decay there is about 41% chance of recording 10 or more counts. Thus we can say that the suitcase is compatible with the null hypothesis (this does not guarantee that there is no radioactive material, just that we don't have enough evidence to suggest there is). On the other hand, if the null hypothesis predicts 3 counts per minute (for which the Poisson distribution predicts only 0.1% chance of recording 10 or more counts) then the suitcase is not compatible with the null hypothesis, and there are likely other factors responsible to produce the measurements.

The test does not directly assert the presence of radioactive material. A successful test asserts that the claim of no radioactive material present is unlikely given the reading (and therefore ...). The double negative (disproving the null hypothesis) of the method is confusing, but using a counter-example to disprove is standard mathematical practice. The attraction of the method is its practicality. We know (from experience) the expected range of counts with only ambient radioactivity present, so we can say that a measurement is unusually large. Statistics just formalizes the intuitive by using numbers instead of adjectives. We probably do not know the characteristics of the radioactive suitcases; We just assume
that they produce larger readings.

To slightly formalize intuition: radioactivity is suspected if the Geiger-count with the suitcase is among or exceeds the greatest (5% or 1%) of the Geiger-counts made with ambient radiation alone. This makes no assumptions about the distribution of counts. Many ambient radiation observations are required to obtain good probability estimates for rare events.

The test described here is more fully the null-hypothesis statistical significance test. The null hypothesis represents what we would believe by default, before seeing any evidence. Statistical significance is a possible finding of the test, declared when the observed sample is unlikely to have occurred by chance if the null hypothesis were true. The name of the test describes its formulation and its possible outcome. One characteristic of the test is its crisp decision: to reject or not reject the null hypothesis. A calculated value is compared to a threshold, which is determined from the tolerable risk of error.

Variations and sub-classes 
Statistical hypothesis testing is a key technique of both frequentist inference and Bayesian inference, although the two types of inference have notable differences. Statistical hypothesis tests define a procedure that controls (fixes) the probability of incorrectly deciding that a default position (null hypothesis) is incorrect. The procedure is based on how likely it would be for a set of observations to occur if the null hypothesis were true. This probability of making an incorrect decision is not the probability that the null hypothesis is true, nor whether any specific alternative hypothesis is true. This contrasts with other possible techniques of decision theory in which the null and alternative hypothesis are treated on a more equal basis.

One naïve Bayesian approach to hypothesis testing is to base decisions on the posterior probability, but this fails when comparing point and continuous hypotheses. Other approaches to decision making, such as Bayesian decision theory, attempt to balance the consequences of incorrect decisions across all possibilities, rather than concentrating on a single null hypothesis. A number of other approaches to reaching a decision based on data are available via decision theory and optimal decisions, some of which have desirable properties. Hypothesis testing, though, is a dominant approach to data analysis in many fields of science. Extensions to the theory of hypothesis testing include the study of the power of tests, i.e. the probability of correctly rejecting the null hypothesis given that it is false. Such considerations can be used for the purpose of sample size determination prior to the collection of data.

Neyman–Pearson hypothesis testing 
An example of Neyman–Pearson hypothesis testing (or null hypothesis statistical significance testing) can be made by a change to the radioactive suitcase example. If the "suitcase" is actually a shielded container for the transportation of radioactive material, then a test might be used to select among three hypotheses: no radioactive source present, one present, two (all) present. The test could be required for safety, with actions required in each case. The Neyman–Pearson lemma of hypothesis testing says that a good criterion for the selection of hypotheses is the ratio of their probabilities (a likelihood ratio). A simple method of solution is to select the hypothesis with the highest probability for the Geiger counts observed. The typical result matches intuition: few counts imply no source, many counts imply two sources and intermediate counts imply one source. Notice also that usually there are problems for proving a negative. Null hypotheses should be at least falsifiable.

Neyman–Pearson theory can accommodate both prior probabilities and the costs of actions resulting from decisions. The former allows each test to consider the results of earlier tests (unlike Fisher's significance tests). The latter allows the consideration of economic issues (for example) as well as probabilities. A likelihood ratio remains a good criterion for selecting among hypotheses.

The two forms of hypothesis testing are based on different problem formulations. The original test is analogous to a true/false question; the Neyman–Pearson test is more like multiple choice. In the view of Tukey the former produces a conclusion on the basis of only strong evidence while the latter produces a decision on the basis of available evidence. While the two tests seem quite different both mathematically and philosophically, later developments lead to the opposite claim. Consider many tiny radioactive sources. The hypotheses become 0,1,2,3... grains of radioactive sand. There is little distinction between none or some radiation (Fisher) and 0 grains of radioactive sand versus all of the alternatives (Neyman–Pearson). The major Neyman–Pearson paper of 1933 also considered composite hypotheses (ones whose distribution includes an unknown parameter). An example proved the optimality of the (Student's) t-test, "there can be no better test for the hypothesis under consideration" (p 321). Neyman–Pearson theory was proving the optimality of Fisherian methods from its inception.

Fisher's significance testing has proven a popular flexible statistical tool in application with little mathematical growth potential. Neyman–Pearson hypothesis testing is claimed as a pillar of mathematical statistics, creating a new paradigm for the field. It also stimulated new applications in statistical process control, detection theory, decision theory and game theory. Both formulations have been successful, but the successes have been of a different character.

The dispute over formulations is unresolved. Science primarily uses Fisher's (slightly modified) formulation as taught in introductory statistics. Statisticians study Neyman–Pearson theory in graduate school. Mathematicians are proud of uniting the formulations. Philosophers consider them separately. Learned opinions deem the formulations variously competitive (Fisher vs Neyman), incompatible or complementary. The dispute has become more complex since Bayesian inference has achieved respectability.

The terminology is inconsistent. Hypothesis testing can mean any mixture of two formulations that both changed with time. Any discussion of significance testing vs hypothesis testing is doubly vulnerable to confusion.

Fisher thought that hypothesis testing was a useful strategy for performing industrial quality control, however, he strongly disagreed that hypothesis testing could be useful for scientists.
Hypothesis testing provides a means of finding test statistics used in significance testing. The concept of power is useful in explaining the consequences of adjusting the significance level and is heavily used in sample size determination. The two methods remain philosophically distinct. They usually (but not always) produce the same mathematical answer. The preferred answer is context dependent. While the existing merger of Fisher and Neyman–Pearson theories has been heavily criticized, modifying the merger to achieve Bayesian goals has been considered.

Criticism

Criticism of statistical hypothesis testing fills volumes. Much of the criticism can be summarized by the following issues:
 The interpretation of a p-value is dependent upon stopping rule and definition of multiple comparison. The former often changes during the course of a study and the latter is unavoidably ambiguous. (i.e. "p values depend on both the (data) observed and on the other possible (data) that might have been observed but weren't").
 Confusion resulting (in part) from combining the methods of Fisher and Neyman–Pearson which are conceptually distinct.
 Emphasis on statistical significance to the exclusion of estimation and confirmation by repeated experiments.
 Rigidly requiring statistical significance as a criterion for publication, resulting in publication bias. Most of the criticism is indirect. Rather than being wrong, statistical hypothesis testing is misunderstood, overused and misused.
 When used to detect whether a difference exists between groups, a paradox arises. As improvements are made to experimental design (e.g. increased precision of measurement and sample size), the test becomes more lenient. Unless one accepts the absurd assumption that all sources of noise in the data cancel out completely, the chance of finding statistical significance in either direction approaches 100%. However, this absurd assumption that the mean difference between two groups cannot be zero implies that the data cannot be independent and identically distributed (i.i.d.) because the expected difference between any two subgroups of i.i.d. random variates is zero; therefore, the i.i.d. assumption is also absurd.
Layers of philosophical concerns. The probability of statistical significance is a function of decisions made by experimenters/analysts. If the decisions are based on convention they are termed arbitrary or mindless while those not so based may be termed subjective. To minimize type II errors, large samples are recommended. In psychology practically all null hypotheses are claimed to be false for sufficiently large samples so "...it is usually nonsensical to perform an experiment with the sole aim of rejecting the null hypothesis." "Statistically significant findings are often misleading" in psychology. Statistical significance does not imply practical significance, and correlation does not imply causation. Casting doubt on the null hypothesis is thus far from directly supporting the research hypothesis.
"[I]t does not tell us what we want to know". Lists of dozens of complaints are available.

Critics and supporters are largely in factual agreement regarding the characteristics of null hypothesis significance testing (NHST): While it can provide critical information, it is inadequate as the sole tool for statistical analysis. Successfully rejecting the null hypothesis may offer no support for the research hypothesis. The continuing controversy concerns the selection of the best statistical practices for the near-term future given the existing practices. However, adequate research design can minimize this issue. Critics would prefer to ban NHST completely, forcing a complete departure from those practices, while supporters suggest a less absolute change.

Controversy over significance testing, and its effects on publication bias in particular, has produced several results. The American Psychological Association has strengthened its statistical reporting requirements after review, medical journal publishers have recognized the obligation to publish some results that are not statistically significant to combat publication bias and a journal (Journal of Articles in Support of the Null Hypothesis) has been created to publish such results exclusively. Textbooks have added some cautions and increased coverage of the tools necessary to estimate the size of the sample required to produce significant results. Major organizations have not abandoned use of significance tests although some have discussed doing so.

Alternatives

A unifying position of critics is that statistics should not lead to an accept-reject conclusion or decision, but to an estimated value with an interval estimate; this data-analysis philosophy is broadly referred to as estimation statistics. Estimation statistics can be accomplished with either frequentist  or Bayesian methods.

One strong critic of significance testing suggested a list of reporting alternatives: effect sizes for importance, prediction intervals for confidence, replications and extensions for replicability, meta-analyses for generality. None of these suggested alternatives produces a conclusion/decision. Lehmann said that hypothesis testing theory can be presented in terms of conclusions/decisions, probabilities, or confidence intervals. "The distinction between the ... approaches is largely one of reporting and interpretation."

On one "alternative" there is no disagreement: Fisher himself said, "In relation to the test of significance, we may say that a phenomenon is experimentally demonstrable when we know how to conduct an experiment which will rarely fail to give us a statistically significant result." Cohen, an influential critic of significance testing, concurred, "... don't look for a magic alternative to NHST [null hypothesis significance testing] ... It doesn't exist." "... given the problems of statistical induction, we must finally rely, as have the older sciences, on replication." The "alternative" to significance testing is repeated testing. The easiest way to decrease statistical uncertainty is by obtaining more data, whether by increased sample size or by repeated tests. Nickerson claimed to have never seen the publication of a literally replicated experiment in psychology. An indirect approach to replication is meta-analysis.

Bayesian inference is one proposed alternative to significance testing. (Nickerson cited 10 sources suggesting it, including Rozeboom (1960)). For example, Bayesian parameter estimation can provide rich information about the data from which researchers can draw inferences, while using uncertain priors that exert only minimal influence on the results when enough data is available. Psychologist John K. Kruschke has suggested Bayesian estimation as an alternative for the t-test and has also contrasted Bayesian estimation for assessing null values with Bayesian model comparison for hypothesis testing. Two competing models/hypotheses can be compared using Bayes factors. Bayesian methods could be criticized for requiring information that is seldom available in the cases where significance testing is most heavily used. Neither the prior probabilities nor the probability distribution of the test statistic under the alternative hypothesis are often available in the social sciences.

Advocates of a Bayesian approach sometimes claim that the goal of a researcher is most often to objectively assess the probability that a hypothesis is true based on the data they have collected.  Neither Fisher's significance testing, nor Neyman–Pearson hypothesis testing can provide this information, and do not claim to. The probability a hypothesis is true can only be derived from use of Bayes' Theorem, which was unsatisfactory to both the Fisher and Neyman–Pearson camps due to the explicit use of subjectivity in the form of the prior probability. Fisher's strategy is to sidestep this with the p-value (an objective index based on the data alone) followed by inductive inference, while Neyman–Pearson devised their approach of inductive behaviour.

See also

 Statistics
 Behrens–Fisher problem
 Bootstrapping (statistics)
 Checking if a coin is fair
 Comparing means test decision tree
 Complete spatial randomness
 Counternull
 Falsifiability
 Fisher's method for combining independent tests of significance
 Granger causality
 Look-elsewhere effect
 Modifiable areal unit problem
 Multivariate hypothesis testing
 Omnibus test
 Dichotomous thinking
Almost sure hypothesis testing
Akaike information criterion
Bayesian information criterion

References

Further reading
 Lehmann E.L. (1992) "Introduction to Neyman and Pearson (1933) On the Problem of the Most Efficient Tests of Statistical Hypotheses". In: Breakthroughs in Statistics, Volume 1, (Eds Kotz, S., Johnson, N.L.), Springer-Verlag.  (followed by reprinting of the paper)

External links

 
 
 Bayesian critique of classical hypothesis testing
 Critique of classical hypothesis testing highlighting long-standing qualms of statisticians
 Dallal GE (2007) The Little Handbook of Statistical Practice (A good tutorial)
 References for arguments for and against hypothesis testing
 Statistical Tests Overview: How to choose the correct statistical test
  Statistical Analysis based Hypothesis Testing Method in Biological Knowledge Discovery; Md. Naseef-Ur-Rahman Chowdhury, Suvankar Paul, Kazi Zakia Sultana

Online calculators
 MBAStats confidence interval and hypothesis test calculators
 Some p-value and hypothesis test calculators.

 
Design of experiments
Logic and statistics
Mathematical and quantitative methods (economics)